Nicholas Hugh Brown (born 13 June 1950) is a British Independent politician who has been the Member of Parliament (MP) for Newcastle upon Tyne East since 1983, making him the fifth longest serving MP in the House of Commons. He is the longest serving Chief Whip of the Labour Party, holding the position in three separate periods under six Labour leaders – Tony Blair, Gordon Brown, Harriet Harman, Ed Miliband, Jeremy Corbyn and Keir Starmer. He also held several ministerial positions whilst his party was in government from 1997 until 2010. On 26 May 2021, Brown was elected as chair of the Finance Committee. Brown sits in the House of Commons as an independent, having had the whip removed in September 2022, triggered by an investigation affecting his Labour membership.

Early life
Brown was born in Hawkhurst, Kent, and brought up in nearby Tunbridge Wells, attending Tunbridge Wells Grammar School for Boys before studying at the University of Manchester. After graduating from university, Brown worked in the advertising department for Procter & Gamble. He then became a legal adviser to the Northern Region of the GMBATU, later GMB, based in Newcastle upon Tyne.

Political career

Early political career: 1980–1997 
In 1980, Brown was elected to Newcastle City Council as a Labour Councillor, representing the Walker ward.

Brown was chosen as the new Labour Party candidate for the parliamentary seat after Mike Thomas, the Labour Member of Parliament (MP) for Newcastle upon Tyne East, defected to the SDP. Brown easily retained the seat for Labour at the 1983 general election. Originally elected to the Commons in the same year as Gordon Brown and Tony Blair, Brown was initially close to both men, but over time became his namesake Brown's staunchest ally, though the two are unrelated.

Brown was first appointed to Labour's frontbench team in 1985 as a shadow solicitor general. In 1988, he was moved to the position of Treasury spokesperson before briefly becoming shadow spokesperson for health between 1994 and 1995.

In the 1994 Labour leadership election, he supported Gordon Brown and acted as his unofficial campaign manager and, according to biographer Paul Routledge, advised against him pulling out of the contest in Blair's favour.

In 1995, Brown was appointed as Deputy Chief Whip in the House of Commons and played a central role in Parliament in trying to defeat the Conservative government's parliamentary agenda.

Government: 1997–2010 
Following Labour's election victory in 1997, he was appointed as Government Chief Whip in the House of Commons, but stayed there only for just over a year, to then be moved to the Ministry of Agriculture, Fisheries and Food in Tony Blair's first ministerial shuffle in July 1998. This change, which followed the publication of the Routledge biography earlier that year, was widely seen as a demotion, and ascribed to his close connection with Gordon Brown.

His tenure as the Minister of Agriculture, Fisheries and Food saw several animal health crises, ending with the 2001 foot-and-mouth outbreak. Brown's handling of the outbreak was criticised by some and used to attack the government, though his handling of the crisis maintained the support of the farming and food industries and the veterinary profession throughout the crisis. Suggestions that a vaccination strategy should have been practised in preference to the culling of hundreds of thousands of animals, made with the benefit of hindsight, did not help his cause, and he was demoted to Minister of State for Work, with non-voting Cabinet rank, after the general election of 2001. In June 2003, he was dropped from the Government altogether.

In 2004, he was one of the organisers of a backbench rebellion against the government's proposals for the introduction of tuition fees, but hours before the vote announced that he had received significant concessions from the Government and would now support it. Some suspected that the Chancellor had placed considerable pressure on him to back down and the affair cost Brown some credibility.

On 29 June 2007, Gordon Brown become Prime Minister and immediately appointed Nick Brown as the Regional Minister for the North East and simultaneously as the new Deputy Chief Whip.

Following a government reshuffle in 2008, Gordon Brown returned Nick Brown to his original government position of Government Chief Whip, whilst retaining his position as Minister for the North East.

In 2009, Brown was appointed to investigate the legitimacy of expense claims by Labour MPs between 2004 and 2008. According to  The Daily Telegraph in this period Brown himself claimed a total of £87,708 for his constituency home.

Brown's mortgage interest repayments for 2007-8 totalled £6,600, but he also claimed a total of £23,068, just £15 below the maximum allowable amount for the year. The claim included £4,800 for food – the maximum allowable amount – £2,880 for repairs and insurance, £2,880 for services, £897.65 for cleaning, £1,640 for phones and £1,810 for utilities. Brown, however, has said that he saved the taxpayer a considerable amount of money by turning down a Government car and driver upon being made Chief Whip, the annual cost of which would have been around £100,000.

Opposition: 2010–present 
On 29 September 2010, newly elected Labour Party leader Ed Miliband asked Brown to stand down as Chief Whip due to the need for a "break from the past".

On 29 January 2011, during the News of the World phone hacking affair, Brown said that his landline may have been bugged in 1998, around the time of his outing. He was also contacted by an undisclosed police force in the West of England in 2003, who told him that they were pursuing a phone-tapping prosecution and he was one of those who may have been targeted. The case collapsed when it reached court and full details of the allegations were never disclosed. Brown said that: "Given that it was near [Prince Charles' home] Highgrove, my assumption was that this might involve the Royal Family. But I was never explicitly told that."

In 2014, Brown publicly opposed his party's proposal to scrap the position of Police and Crime Commissioner (PCC), citing the effectiveness of the three PCCs in North East England at the time.

Ahead of the 2016 EU membership referendum, Brown stated he supported remaining in the European Union. 

On 6 October 2016, Brown was appointed by Jeremy Corbyn as Chief Whip of the Labour Party, and thus became Opposition Chief Whip in the House of Commons. Brown went on to play an important role in the Parliamentary debates and votes over Brexit during 2018 and 2019, including inflicting the largest ever defeat upon the government in history.

Brown was reappointed as Labour Chief Whip by Sir Keir Starmer after the latter's victory in the 2020 Labour Party leadership election. This reappointment meant that Brown was the only person to have held the role for three non-consecutive terms, as well as under six different leaders (Blair, Brown, Harman, briefly Miliband, Corbyn and Starmer) across four decades. Brown left the role of Chief Whip for the third time as a result of Starmer's Shadow Cabinet reshuffle in May 2021, and is currently suspended for an unknown reason.

Brown is a member of the Labour Friends of Israel group.

Personal life
Brown is a holder of the freedom of the City of Newcastle upon Tyne award, a supporter of Humanists UK, a member of GMB, and an honorary associate of the National Secular Society. He is known to have a love for classical music, which developed during his time at Manchester University. From 2012 until 2022, he was a Non-Executive Director of the Mariinsky Theatre Trust (the Anglo-Russian friendship organisation that supports the work of the Mariinsky Theatre in the UK). He is a governor of Walker Riverside Academy, a patron of Leeds Youth Opera and a trustee of the Biscuit Factory art exhibition in Shieldfield, Newcastle. He formerly chaired the all-party parliamentary group for motorcycle speedway racing. 

Although born and raised in Kent, Brown is sometimes referred to as "Newcastle Brown" – a reference to the ale and his long-standing connections to Newcastle.

Notes

References

External links

Nick Brown MP official constituency website
Profile at the Labour Party

|-

|-

|-

|-

|-

|-

|-

|-

|-

|-

|-

|-

|-

|-

|-

|-

1950 births
Living people
Agriculture ministers of the United Kingdom
Alumni of the University of Manchester
Councillors in Newcastle upon Tyne
English humanists
Gay politicians
Independent members of the House of Commons of the United Kingdom
Labour Party (UK) MPs for English constituencies
LGBT members of the Parliament of the United Kingdom
English LGBT politicians
Labour Friends of Israel
Members of the Privy Council of the United Kingdom
People educated at Tunbridge Wells Grammar School for Boys
People from Hawkhurst
Treasurers of the Household
UK MPs 1983–1987
UK MPs 1987–1992
UK MPs 1992–1997
UK MPs 1997–2001
UK MPs 2001–2005
UK MPs 2005–2010
UK MPs 2010–2015
UK MPs 2015–2017
UK MPs 2017–2019
UK MPs 2019–present